The Little Gratiot River is an  river in Keweenaw County on the Upper Peninsula of Michigan in the United States. It flows from Lake Gratiot into Lac La Belle, which connects with Lake Superior.

See also
List of rivers of Michigan

References

Michigan  Streamflow Data from the USGS

Rivers of Michigan
Rivers of Keweenaw County, Michigan
Tributaries of Lake Superior